Little Hills 158 is an Indian reserve of the Lac La Ronge Indian Band in Saskatchewan. In the 2016 Canadian Census, it recorded a population of 0 living in 0 of its 0 total private dwellings.

References

Indian reserves in Saskatchewan
Division No. 18, Saskatchewan